Louise Poitevin (1820-1908) was a French pioneer of aviation, known for being the first woman to take horses aloft with her.

On September 12, 1847, she took flight in a balloon with someone named Rossi and remained in flight for two hours.  In Portugal, in the summer of 1857, she and her husband carried out a series of hot-air balloon flights, two in Porto, four in Lisbon, and two in Coimbra. She is the second woman to fly over Portugal, the first being Bertrande Senges. She finished her career in 1894 at the age of 55, by landing on horseback on a rooftop in Copenhagen.

References

Further reading (in French) 

 .
 .
 .
 Bernard Marck, Les Aviatrices : des pionnières aux cosmonautes, L’Archipel, 1993.
 Bernard Marck, Elles ont conquis le ciel: 100 femmes qui ont fait l'histoire de l'aviation, 2009.

French aviators
French women aviators
1820 births
1908 deaths